Mr Moon is an animated children's television series co-produced by Sparky Animation, Skaramoosh London and Title Entertainment.

The series is of 52 episodes each of 12 minutes.

Broadcast 

It has been broadcast by Playhouse Disney (UK and Ireland), TVO (Canada), ABC (Australia), TVNZ (New Zealand), ATV (Turkey), Zee TV (India), KBS (South Korea), PBS (Thailand), and Space Toon (Indonesia).

Premise and format
Mr Moon is a children's television programme that teaches children the names of stars and constellations. The show focuses on singing, games, and activities which children can join along too.

Episode list

References

External links

2010s British animated television series
2010 British television series debuts
2010 British television series endings
British children's animated space adventure television series
Canadian children's animated space adventure television series
Disney Channels Worldwide original programming
2010s British children's television series
TVO original programming